The Dragu is a tributary of the river Almaș in Romania. It flows into the Almaș in Hida.

References

Rivers of Romania
Rivers of Sălaj County